The Juneau Police Department (JPD) is a law enforcement agency which serves Juneau, Alaska.

The department consists of two divisions: Administrative Support Services and Operations.  Within these divisions there are five units: Patrol, Investigations, Community Service, Records and Dispatch. The department includes specialists in SWAT, bomb disposal and hostage negotiation.

The Chief is Ed Mercer, the Capital's First Alaskan Native Police Chief.

In April 2008, the police reversed its previous policy of not reporting rapes as sex crimes in its daily briefing report.

In July 2008, the police department reported an increase in robberies.

Juneau Crime Line, a  non-profit organization, offers rewards for anonymous crime tips in cooperation with the police department.

On December 1, 2009, Juneau PD became the first agency accredited by Alaska Law Enforcement Agency Accreditation Commission (ALEAAC).

Rank structure

Fallen officers
Since the establishment of the Juneau Police Department, four officers have died while on duty.

See also

 List of law enforcement agencies in Alaska
 Capital City Fire and Rescue

References

External links
 Juneau Alaska Police Department
 Alaska Association of Chiefs of Police

Juneau, Alaska
Municipal police departments of Alaska